Mangasuli  is a village located in Northern Karnataka, India. It is located in the Athani taluk of Belgaum district in Karnataka.

Demographics

Religious significance
Mangasuli is known for its temple of Lord Khandoba, among the regions of Southern Maharashtra and Northern Karnataka. The name Mangasuli stands for "Malla" (name of the demon) - "suli" (killed). It is said that Lord Khandoba killed the demon Malla in this place. The other name of Lord Khandoba, Malhari or Mallari, also originates from the words "Malla" and "ari" (enemy) & "Mallayya" in Kannada language.

Khandoba of Mangasuli is the Kuldevta of many families in the region. It is a tradition to visit the temple after important events in their families (like marriage, birth of a child), to seek the Lord's blessings. Many devotees visit the place during the yearly "Utsav", which is celebrated from the first to the sixth baning moon nights of the Hindu calendar month Margashirsha. The festival culminates into a Yatra on the last day of "Champa Shashthi".

Mangasuli was part of "Sangli Sansthan" before linguistic based formation of the states of Karnataka and Maharashtra. It has a sizeable population of people speaking either Marathi or Kannada.

Location and transportation
Mangasuli is a small town located near Maharashtra Karnataka border. It is about 30 km from Miraj, 38 km from Sangli and 25 km from Athani. Mangasuli may be reached via state transport buses available from Miraj, Sangli, Athani and Kagwad. The nearest railway station is Ugar, about 10 km away, and Shedbal which is about 11 km from Mangasuli. The nearest Railway Junction is Miraj Junction railway station which is 30 km from Mangsuli.

Nearby religious places
Narsobawadi - Located 27 kilometres from Mangasuli, famous for the Shri Datta Temple.
Kokatnur - Located 42 kilometres from Mangasuli, the Yallama temple at Kokatnur is visited by many devotees from different parts of Northern Karnataka and Southern  Maharashtra every year.
Chinchali - A celebrated pilgrimage centre of the goddess Mayakka Devi, located 25 kilometres from Mangasuli. There is a strong belief that the goddess Mayakka Devi fulfills the wishes of all the worshipers. There are many unsolved mysteries and supernatural occurrences associated with the temple.

Business and economy
The main commercial crop in the area of Mangasuli is sugarcane. Many sugarcane factories are located nearby Mangasuli.

See also
 Sangli
 Belgaum
 Districts of Karnataka

References

External links

 http://Belgaum.nic.in/

Villages in Belagavi district